Canvass White (September 8, 1790 – December 18, 1834) was an American engineer and inventor. He was chief engineer at the Delaware and Raritan Canal and he patented Rosendale cement, which became the dominant cement in the United States until 1900.

Early life and family
White was born on September 8, 1790, in Whitestown, New York to Hugh White, Jr. (January 16, 1763 - April 7, 1827) and Tryphena Lawrence White (July 4, 1768 - March 30, 1800, a native of Canaan, Connecticut).

He received his education at the Fairfield Academy.

Engineer

White's first job as an engineer was on the Erie Canal in 1816, working for chief engineer Judge Benjamin Wright. In the autumn of 1817, he travelled to England to study their canal system. When he returned he patented a type of natural cement, Rosendale cement which was used to build some of the major works in the US including the Delaware and Hudson Canal and Brooklyn Bridge. He continued his work in New York until 1824. From 1824 until the summer of 1826, he was Chief Engineer on the Union Canal in Pennsylvania. He was appointed Chief Engineer of the Delaware and Raritan Canal in 1825 and of the Lehigh Canal in 1827. He was also a consulting engineer for the Schuylkill Navigation Company and for the Chesapeake and Delaware Canal. He became President of the Cohoes Company when it was incorporated on March 28, 1826. He was also highly involved in the design of the Croton Aqueduct though the position of chief engineer eventually went to John B. Jervis.

Of White, author Bill Bryson writes, "the great unsung Canvass White didn't just make New York rich; more profoundly, he helped make America."

Works
Works of White's that survive include:
Carbon County Section of the Lehigh Canal, along the Lehigh River Weissport and vicinity, Pennsylvania, listed on the National Register of Historic Places (NRHP)
Enfield Canal, along Connecticut River from Windsor Locks N to Thompsonville Windsor Locks, CT, NRHP-listed
Lehigh Canal, Lehigh Gap to S Walnutport boundary Walnutport, PA, NRHP-listed
Lehigh Canal, Walnutport to Allentown section, Allentown and vicinity, PA, NRHP-listed
Lehigh Canal: eastern section, Glendon and Abbott Street industrial sites, Lehigh River from Hopeville to confluence of Lehigh and Delaware Rivers Easton, Pennsylvania, NRHP-listed
Lehigh Canal Allentown to Hopeville Section, along the Lehigh River, Bethlehem, Pennsylvania, NRHP-listed 
Union Canal Tunnel, west of Lebanon off PA 72 Lebanon, PA, NRHP-listed

Death
White died in 1834 and was buried in Princeton Cemetery in Princeton, New Jersey.

See also

Josiah White

References

Sources
"Canvass White, Esquire (1790-1834): Civil Engineer." (1983)
Lists biographical information was obtained from the following sources: Charles B. Stuart, Lives and Works of Civil and Military Engineers in America (New York, 1871); William P. White, "Canvass White's Services" in Buffalo Historical Society Publications, Vol. 13 (Buffalo, 1909), 353:66; and the American Society of Civil Engineers, A Biographical Dictionary of American Civil Engineers (New York, 1972), 126-27.

Further reading 
 Whitford's History of New York Canals, (1906), Vol II, page 1170
 William Pierrepont White; Canvass White's Services Buffalo Historical Society (1909) volume 13, page 352-366
 Albert C. Jensen; Engineering Clinton's Ditch; Civil Engineering, volume 33, September 1963, pages 48–50
 Bastoni, Gerald Robert. "Canvass White, Esquire (1790-1834): Civil Engineer." (1983). Accessed at Lehigh University digital resources on June 15, 2016.

External links
 
Canvass White – Obituary
 ASCE : Canvass White

19th-century American inventors
American surveyors
American civil engineers
American canal engineers
People from Whitestown, New York
1790 births
1834 deaths
Burials at Princeton Cemetery
Erie Canal
Engineers from Florida
Engineers from New York (state)